Whiston is a hamlet in the South Staffordshire district of Staffordshire, England. Population details taken at the 2011 census can be found under Penkridge.

See also
Listed buildings in Penkridge

Villages in Staffordshire
Penkridge